Podkhoz is a rural locality (a selo) in Kolyvansky Selsoviet, Kuryinsky District, Altai Krai, Russia. The population was 102 as of 2013. There are 2 streets.

Geography 
Podkhoz is located 54 km southeast of Kurya (the district's administrative centre) by road. Kolyvan is the nearest rural locality.

References 

Rural localities in Kuryinsky District